The Battle of Wyoming, also known as the Wyoming Massacre, was a military engagement during the American Revolutionary War between Patriot militia and a force of Loyalist soldiers and Iroquois warriors. The battle took place in the Wyoming Valley of Pennsylvania on July 3, 1778 in what is now Luzerne County. The result was an overwhelming defeat for the Americans. There were roughly 300 Patriot casualties, many of whom were killed by the Iroquois as they fled the battlefield or after they had been taken prisoner.

Widespread looting and burning of buildings occurred throughout the Wyoming Valley subsequent to the battle, but non-combatants were spared. Most of the inhabitants fled across the Pocono Mountains to Stroudsburg and Easton or down the Susquehanna River to Sunbury.

Within weeks, a widely distributed but highly inaccurate newspaper report claimed that hundreds of women and children had been massacred. This false version of events was accepted as proven fact by many writers for decades afterwards but has been thoroughly discredited.

Background

In 1777, British general John Burgoyne led the Saratoga campaign to gain control of the Hudson River valley during the American Revolutionary War, but was forced to surrender after the Battles of Saratoga in October. News of the surrender prompted France to enter the war as an American ally. British military officials were concerned that the French might attempt to retake parts of Canada which they had lost in the French and Indian War, so they adopted a more defensive strategy in Quebec. 

The British recruited Loyalists and indigenous allies to conduct a frontier war along the northern and western borders of the Thirteen Colonies. British Indian Department officer John Butler was granted permission to enlist Loyalists in a regiment that came be to known as Butler's Rangers. Seneca chiefs Sayenqueraghta and Cornplanter encouraged Seneca and Cayuga warriors to participate in a raids against frontier settlements. Similarly, Mohawk war leader Joseph Brant encouraged Mohawk participation and recruited Loyalist volunteers to fight with him. By April 1778, the Senecas were raiding settlements along the Allegheny and the West Branch of the Susquehanna River. In late May, Joseph Brant raided Cobleskill in Tryon County, New York.

In early June, Butler, Sayenqueraghta, and Brant met at Tioga Point at the confluence of the Chemung River and the North Branch of the Susquehanna River. While Butler and the Senecas were planning a major attack on the Wyoming Valley, it was agreed that Brant would return to Onaquaga and prepare to raid settlements in New York.

Battle
Major Butler with 110 Butler's Rangers and 464 indigenous warriors departed Tioga Point on June 27, and arrived at the head of the Wyoming Valley three days later. Most of the indigenous warriors were Seneca and Cayuga led by Sayenqueraghta, Cornplanter, and Fish Carrier, but contingents of Munsee Delaware, Onondaga, and Tuscarora were also present. The Americans were alerted to their approach when 12 settlers working in a field and nearby tannery were attacked. 

The inhabitants fled to the forts scattered throughout the Wyoming Valley including Forty Fort, Fort Wyoming (Wilkes-Barre) and Fort Pittston. Meanwhile, the Patriot militia assembled at Forty Fort under the command of Lieutenant Colonel Zebulon Butler, an officer of the Continental Army home on leave.

On July 1, Fort Wintermoot at the north end of the valley surrendered without a shot being fired. The next morning the smaller Fort Jenkins surrendered. The terms of the surrender for both forts promised that the inhabitants would not be harmed.

Demands for Forty Fort to surrender were rebuked. Lieutenant Colonel Butler and his senior officers, Colonel Nathan Denison and Lieutenant Colonel George Dorrance, advocated remaining in the fort, however, their subordinates, led by Lazarus Stewart, were overwhelmingly in favour of marching out to meet the enemy. Butler gave in and by mid-afternoon on July 3, a force of roughly 375 men, organized into five companies of militia and one company of Continentals, sallied from the fort.

Every movement by the Americans was observed by indigenous scouts. Major Butler ordered Fort Wintermoot burned in order to trick the Americans into thinking that he was withdrawing. Butler positioned his forces in a "fine open wood" with the Rangers on the left and his indigenous allies on the right. He ordered his men to lie on the ground and wait for the order to fire. 

The Americans deployed into a line of battle as they approached Fort Wintermoot. After firing three unanswered volleys they had advanced to within 100 yards of Major Butler's position, unaware that they had been flanked by the Seneca and Cayuga.  Following a devastating volley from the Rangers and their indigenous allies, the Seneca and Cayuga broke cover and attacked the Americans with maul, tomahawk and spear.

The battle lasted about 30 minutes. An attempt to reform the American line quickly turned into a frantic rout, as the inexperienced militiamen panicked and ran. It became a deadly race from which only about 60 escaped including Lieutenant Colonel Butler and Colonel Denison. Many of those overtaken by the Seneca and Cayuga were killed and scalped immediately, however, some were taken captive and were later tortured and executed.

In his report to the commanding officer of Fort Niagara, Major Butler stated that his indigenous allies had taken 227 scalps and five prisoners, while Colonel Denison informed him that 302 had been killed.

Aftermath

Lieutenant Colonel Butler and the surviving Continental soldiers left the Wyoming Valley on the morning of July 4 rather than being taken as prisoners of war. That afternoon, Colonel Denison surrendered Forty Fort along with what remained of the militia. Major Butler paroled them on their promise to take no part in further hostilities and gave his assurance that none of the inhabitants would be harmed.

None of inhabitants were killed after the capitulation, but many did have their personal effects plundered by Butler's indigenous allies. In the days that followed, houses and barns throughout the Wyoming Valley were plundered and burned. Mills were destroyed and livestock was driven off. The inhabitants of the valley fled, either east through the Great Swamp and the Pocono Mountains to Fort Penn (Stroudsburg) or Easton, or by rafting down the Susquehanna to Fort Augusta (Sunbury).

In his report, Major Butler wrote: 
But what gives me the sincerest satisfaction is that I can, with great truth, assure you that in the destruction of the settlement not a single person was hurt except such as were in arms, to these, in truth, the Indians gave no quarter.

J. Hector St. John de Crèvecœur, who was in the Wyoming Valley a few weeks after the battle, wrote: "Happily these fierce people, satisfied with the death of those who had opposed them in arms, treated the defenceless ones, the woman and children, with a degree of humanity almost hitherto unparalleled".

At the time of the battle a company of militia led by Captain Jeremiah Blanchard and Lieutenant Timothy Keyes held Pittston Fort, on the east side of the Susquehanna River several miles upstream from Forty Fort. The fort was surrendered on July 4, 1778, one day after the battle, and was later partially burned. In Pittston Fort was reoccupied, restored and strengthened in 1780. It remained in use until after the end of the war.

According to one source, Lieutenant Colonel George Dorrance was captured in the battle. On the 4th, as the victors were moving down to Forty Fort, the captors of Dorrance, two Iroquois, started to take him down to that post. Being an officer of prominence, dressed in a new uniform, with new sword and equipment, he had been spared under the idea that more could be obtained for his ransom than could be made from his slaughter. About a mile from the field he became exhausted, and was unable to proceed farther. They put him to death, one taking his scalp and sword, the other his coat and cocked hat with feather. One of the Indians went through the fort showing off this clothing and took particular pains to exhibit himself to Mrs. Dorrance, who sat grieving over the sad fate of her husband.

Major Butler reported "one Indian killed, two Rangers and eight Indians wounded." He claimed that his force had burned 1,000 houses, and drove off 1,000 cattle as well as many sheep and hogs. Richard Cartwright, Major Butler's civilian secretary, recorded in his journal: "seven wounded, two of who died of their wounds."

Butler and his forces departed the valley on July 8, and returned to Tioga Point. Later that month Butler returned to Fort Niagara while the Rangers, under the command of Captain William Caldwell proceeded to Onaquaga.

In the aftermath of the battle, the settlers who had fled the Wyoming Valley spread reports and rumors about the American defeat that contributed to a general panic across the frontiers of New York and Pennsylvania. Some American newspapers picked up on these rumors and went even further, producing unsubstantiated accounts about the burning of women, children, and wounded soldiers inside Forty Fort on the day after the battle. The American public was outraged by such reports of a massacre and other atrocities. Many saw it as just one more reason to support American independence.

In early August 1778, Lieutenant Colonel Butler returned to the Wyoming Valley with the Westmoreland Independent Company and a company of militia. In late August they were joined by a detachment from Hartley's Additional Continental Regiment. Some of the settlers who had fled in early July also began to return.

In September the Westmoreland Independent Company and Hartley's Additional Continental Regiment participated in a counter-raid commanded by Colonel Thomas Hartley that destroyed a number of abandoned Delaware villages in the vicinity of Tioga Point. Afterwards the Independent Company and a company of Hartley's Regiment garrisoned the rebuilt Fort Wyoming (Wilkes-Barre).

In October 1778, a burial party recovered the scattered remains of the fallen. According to one source, 60 Patriot bodies were found on the battlefield and another 36 on the line of retreat. Years later they were exhumed and reburied in a common grave when the Wyoming Monument was built.

Many of the Seneca were angered by the accusations of atrocities following the Battle of Wyoming, which they denied committing. Coupled with anger at militiamen ignoring their paroles, such accusations led the Seneca to attack civilians at the Cherry Valley in November 1778. The Battle of Wyoming and the Cherry Valley Massacre encouraged American military leaders to strike back on the frontier. In the late summer of 1779, the Sullivan Expedition, commissioned by General George Washington, methodically destroyed 40 Iroquois villages and an enormous quantity of stored corn and vegetables throughout upstate New York. The Iroquois struggled to recover from the damage inflicted by Sullivan's soldiers, and many died of starvation that winter, however, they continued to raid American settlements until the end of the war.

Legacy

The Battle of Wyoming remained well-known to most Americans for the rest of the eighteenth century and for most of the nineteenth. It particularly reemerged in national discourse during the War of 1812 when Americans again found themselves fighting the British and their indigenous allies on the frontier. Some newspaper accounts readily compared the Battle of Frenchtown (also known as the River Raisin Massacre) in 1813 to the Wyoming Massacre.

The "Wyoming Massacre" was described by the Scottish poet Thomas Campbell in his 1809 poem "Gertrude of Wyoming". Campbell depicted Mohawk war leader Joseph Brant as a "monster" in the poem, even though Brant was at Onaquaga on the day of the attack.

The western state of Wyoming is named after the Wyoming Valley. The state received its name from the U.S. Congress when the Wyoming Territory was created in 1868.

Construction of a monument to commemorate the battle began in 1833 but took a decade to complete due to a lack of funds. The 19 meter (63 ft) tall obelisk is the site of a common grave containing the remains of many of the victims of the battle. The names of 176 of the slain are inscribed on the monument.

The Battle of Wyoming is commemorated each year by the Wyoming Commemorative Association, a local non-profit organization, which holds an annual ceremony on the grounds of the Wyoming Monument. The commemorative ceremonies began in 1878 to mark the 100th anniversary of the battle and massacre.  The principal speaker at the event was President Rutherford B. Hayes. During the 100th anniversary commemoration, the people of Wyoming Valley used the motto "An honest tale speeds best when plainly told" in an effort to promote the historical account of the battle. The annual program has continued each year since then.

Gallery

American order of battle

Officer Commanding (Lieutenant Colonel Zebulon Butler)

Continental Army

Captain Detrick Hewitt's Company (40 officers and men)

24th Regiment of Connecticut Militia (Colonel Nathan Denison, Lieutenant Colonel George Dorrance)

Shawnee Company (Captain Asaph Whittlesey) [40 officers and men]
Hanover Company (Captain Wm McKarrchen but commanded by Captain Lazarus Stewart(30 officers and men)
Lower Wilkes-Barre Company (Captain James Bidlack Jr. [38 officers and men]
Upper Wilkes-Barre Company (Captain Rezin Geer [30 officers and men]
Kingston Company commanded by Captain Aholiab Buck [40 officers and men]

Supernumeraries

Lt Elijah Shoemaker
Lt Asa Stevens
Lt Daniel Gore (wounded)
Ensign Silas Gore
Lt Mattias Hollenback
Captain Robert Durkee
Captain Samuel Ransom
Lt Perin Ross
Lt Timothy Pierce
an additional 100 men who were neither mustered nor enrolled may have participated in the battle

Notes

The following units did not take part in the battle:
Consolidated Company from Ransom and Durkee companies commanded by Captain Simon Spaulding. {1st Lt-became captain June 24, 1778-d.Jan 24, 1814}; {Note: Spaulding Company formed under Congress June 23, 1778, reuniting Durkee and Ransom companies} {92 men; besides Pierce one reported killed; one wounded and scalped; one wounded and four sick. Although it had casualties from the battle, reportedly this company was either 24 miles at Bear Creek or 35 miles at Merwin's the night of the battle and helped bury the dead several weeks after the battle. Another source reports this company with a total of 69 names with 1 name erased; that 27 were of Ransom and 30 of Burkee's companies; and of whom 4 were killed at Wyoming.}
Pittston Company commanded by Captain Jeremiah Blanchard at Pittston Fort {40 men}
Huntington and Salem Company commanded by Captain John Franklin at Home {35 men}
1st Alarm Company (Captain James Bidlack Sr.) [garrisoned Shawnee Fort) and 2nd Alarm Company (Dr. William Hooker Smith) [garrisoned Wilkes-Barre Fort]

References

Citations

Bibliography
 Blackburne, C. (2019). Remembering the Revolutionary War Battle of Wyoming Like it Was Yesterday. [online] Wnep.com. Available at: https://wnep.com/2018/07/04/remembering-the-revolutionary-war-battle-of-wyoming-like-it-was-yesterday/ [Accessed 25 Feb. 2019].

 
Pitcavage, B. (2019). Reenactment of the Battle of Wyoming is a Fourth of July tradition. [online] Citizensvoice.com. Available at: https://www.citizensvoice.com/arts-living/reenactment-of-the-battle-of-wyoming-is-a-fourth-of-july-tradition-1.2356477 [Accessed 25 Feb. 2019].

Further reading

External links

 Major John Butler's Report of July 3, 1778
 Luzerne Co Gen Web on Wyoming Massacre
 Battle of Wyoming account
 Matthias Hollenback, Revolutionary War soldier, survivor of Wyoming Massacre, merchant, judge
 Hanover Twp History and Wyoming Battle
 Wilkes-Barre History
 Battle of Wyoming
 Mead family and the Wyoming Battle
 Gertrude of Wyoming by Thomas Campbell
 The Battle of Wyoming and Hartley's Expedition
 Indians in Pennsylvania - Google Books p. 162–164
Battle of Wyoming at Find A Grave
Former President Jimmy Carter speaks at Wyoming Monument on May 28, 2013 (archived on C-SPAN)

1778 in the United States
Conflicts in 1778
Wyoming Valley
Wyoming
Massacres by Native Americans
History of Luzerne County, Pennsylvania
1778 in Pennsylvania
Wyoming
Wyoming
Massacres in 1778